The Got Me Started Tour was the first headlining concert tour by Argentine singer Tini, in support of her debut studio album, Tini (Martina Stoessel) (2016). The tour began on March 18, 2017 in Madrid at Palacio Vistalegre, and concluded on January 15, 2018 in Mar del Plata at Parque Camet. 

It was the highest-grossing tour of 2017 by Argentine artist, and also at the end of 2017, the tour was placed on Pollstar's "2017 Top 100 Worldwide Tours" list, grossing $8.7 million from 23 shows.

Background 
On October 6, 2016, the singer announced via her social media, that she would be going on her debut concert tour, in March of 2017. The tour was named after her hit single "Got me Started". The dates of concerts in Switzerland, Germany and Austria were first confirmed, and then other dates for European countries followed, that includ shows in Italy, Hungary, Poland, France and Belgium. After European dates, singer confirmed the dates to visit  
her native country Argentina and South America.

Set list 
This set list is representative of the show on March 25, 2017 in Stuttgart, Germany. It is not representative of all concerts for the duration of the tour.

Act 1
 "Got Me Started"
 "Don't Cry for Me"
 "Finders Keepers"
 "Si Tu Te Vas"
 "Sigo Adelante"
Act 2
 "Veo Veo" 
 "Te Creo" 
Act 3
 "Cómo Quieres"
 "Crecimos Juntos"
Act 4
 "Lucha Por Tus Sueños" (Interlude)
 "Ser Mejor"
 "Se Escapa Tu Amor"
 "Yo Te Amo a Tí"
 "Lo Que Tu Alma Escribe"
 "Libre Soy"
Act 5
 "Hoy Somos Más"
Act 6
 "All You Gotta Do"
 "Sorry"  / "Crazy in Love" 
 "Confía en Mí"
Act 7
 "En Mi Mundo"
Encore
 "Great Escape"
 "Siempre Brillarás"

Tour dates

Cancelled shows

Change of venue

Notes

References 

 

 
2017 concert tours
2018 concert tours
Martina Stoessel concert tours
Concert tours of South America
Concert tours of Europe